Güçer, Gücer  is a Turkish surname. Notable people with the surname include:

 Hürriyet Güçer (born 1981), Turkish footballer
 Volkan Gucer, Turkish composer, producer, and musician
 Yusuf Behçet Gücer (1890–1952), Turkish politician

Turkish-language surnames